Zhu Shaoliang or Chu Shao-liang (1891 – 1963) was a general in the National Revolutionary Army of the Republic of China.

In 1935, he was hand-picked by Chiang Kai-shek as the commander-in-chief of the Third Route Army for exterminating the (communist) bandits. In 1937, he participated in the Battle of Shanghai as commander of the 9th Army Group.

References 

People of the Northern Expedition
National Revolutionary Army generals from Fujian
Politicians from Fuzhou
Republic of China politicians from Fujian
1891 births
1963 deaths